Tanner Dodson (born May 9, 1997) is an American professional baseball pitcher in the Los Angeles Dodgers organization.

Amateur career 
Dodson attended Jesuit High School in Carmichael, California. In 2015, as a senior, he batted .430 along with pitching to a 2.10 ERA. He was selected by the New York Mets in the 31st round of the 2015 Major League Baseball draft, but he did not sign and instead chose to attend the University of California at Berkeley to play college baseball for the California Golden Bears.

As a freshman at California in 2016, Dodson pitched  innings (19 games with nine being starts) in which he compiled a 3.36 ERA. In 2017, as a sophomore, he began playing center field along with pitching. That season, he batted .297 with three home runs and 26 RBIs in 185 at-bats while pitching to a 2-6 record and 5.37 ERA in 19 games (seven starts). After the season, he played collegiate summer baseball for the Wareham Gatemen in the Cape Cod Baseball League, where he was named a league all-star and batted .365 in 29 games, earning him the league batting title. Prior to the 2018 season, Dodson was named a preseason All-American by Baseball America. In 54 games, he batted .320 with one home run and 27 RBIs while along with posting a 2-1 record and 2.48 ERA in 40 relief innings pitched. After the season, he was named to the All-Pac-12 team and the All-Defensive team.

Professional career

Tampa Bay Rays
Dodson was selected 71st overall by the Tampa Bay Rays in the 2018 Major League Baseball draft as a two-way player. He signed for $775,000 and made his professional debut with the Hudson Valley Renegades of the Class A Short Season New York–Penn League. He spent the whole season there, batting .273 with two home runs and 19 RBIs in 49 games along with pitching to a 1-0 record and a 1.44 ERA in 25 relief innings pitched. Dodson spent 2019 with the Charlotte Stone Crabs of the Class A-Advanced Florida State League but missed the last three months of the season after undergoing Tommy John surgery. Over 15 games, he batted .250, and over 17 innings pitched, he compiled a 5.29 ERA. He did not play a minor league game in 2020 since the season was cancelled due to the COVID-19 pandemic.

To begin the 2021 season, Dodson transitioned to pitching full time, was assigned to the Bowling Green Hot Rods of the High-A East, and then was promoted to the Montgomery Biscuits of the Double-A South on August 1. Over 37 appearances for the year, Dodson went 5-2 with a 3.20 ERA and 64 strikeouts over  innings.

Los Angeles Dodgers
On March 18, 2022, Dodson was traded to the Los Angeles Dodgers in exchange for Luke Raley. He was assigned to the Tulsa Drillers of the Double-A Texas League to begin the 2022 season, where he was 4–0 with a 8.39 ERA in 29 appearances. He was selected to play in the Arizona Fall League for the Glendale Desert Dogs after the season.

References

External links 

California Golden Bears bio

Minor league baseball players
1997 births
Living people
Baseball pitchers
Baseball players from California
Sportspeople from Sacramento, California
California Golden Bears baseball players
Wareham Gatemen players
Hudson Valley Renegades players
Charlotte Stone Crabs players
Bowling Green Hot Rods players
Montgomery Biscuits players
Tulsa Drillers players
Glendale Desert Dogs players
Arizona Complex League Dodgers players